Assam Jaitya Parishad (AJP) is a state Political Party in Assam, India. It is formed by two student organizations of Assam, All Assam Students Union (AASU) and Asom Jatiyatabadi Yuba Chatra Parishad (AJYCP) in September 2020. Former All Assam Students Union General Secretary, Lurinjyoti Gogoi is the first president of Assam Jaitya Parishad. Its party symbol is 'Ship', as allotted by Election Commission of India.

Electoral performance 

For 2021 Assam Legislative Assembly election, AJP joined an alliance with Raijor Dal, an offshoot of Krishak Mukti Sangram Samiti. According to the seat-sharing agreement, AJP will contest on 82 seats, and Raijor Dal will contest on 29 seats of Assam.

State Legislative Assembly Elections

References
5. https://results.eci.gov.in/Result2021/partywiseresult-S03.htm

Political parties established in 2020
2020 establishments in Assam
Political parties in Assam
State political parties in Assam
Regionalist parties in India